Curt Elliot Sobel (born October 26, 1953 in Detroit, Michigan) is an American composer and music editor. He won the Primetime Emmy Award for Outstanding Original Music and Lyrics (shared with lyricist Dennis Spiegel) for the song “Why Do I Lie?” from the film by HBO, Cast a Deadly Spell, in August 1992.

His film scores currently include The Flamingo Kid (1984), Alien Nation (1988), Catchfire (1990), Defenseless (1991), A Cool, Dry Place (1998), Body Count (1998), and Tiptoes (2003).

Sobel is a graduate of the University of Michigan and the Berklee College of Music.

References

External links

Living people
1953 births
Musicians from Detroit
American film score composers
University of Michigan School of Music, Theatre & Dance alumni
American male film score composers
Berklee College of Music alumni